Lisa Victoria Alexander is an international expert on heatwaves. She received the Dorothy Hill Medal for her research on climate extremes, the frequency and intensity of heatwaves, and has provided evidence that the frequency and intensity of heatwaves will be influenced by the quantity of anthropogenic greenhouse gas emissions, in particular carbon dioxide. She was a contributing author to the Intergovernmental Panel on Climate Change (IPCC) reports, including the fifth assessment report.

Education and career 

Alexander was awarded a Bachelor of Science in 1995 and Master of Science, in 1998 in the field of Applied Mathematics at Queens University in Northern Ireland. Alexander held the position of research scientist within the Met Office Hadley Centre in the Climate Variability Group from the period of 1998 to 2006. The final year was spent at the Australian Bureau of Meteorology, on a secondment.

Alexander was awarded her PhD from Monash University, (2009), where she won the Mollie Holman medal, for writing the 'best doctoral thesis'. From 2009, she was employed at UNSW, within the Climate Change Research Centre.

In 2013 she was awarded the Dorothy Hill Medal for her research on climate extremes, and how these are changing across the globe and within Australia. Her medal was for her research which provided evidence that future changes in the intensity and frequency of heatwaves will strongly be influenced by the quantity of greenhouse gas emissions.  She has also worked with and published with Sarah Perkins-Kirkpatrick, another of Australia's heatwave experts, and awardee of the Dorothy Hill Medal.

Alexander's has worked with the World Meteorological Organization’s (WMO) Expert Team on Climate Change Detection and Indices (ETCCDI) on topics including the assessment and production of international datasets of rainfall and temperature and climate extremes. She has also worked with the Expert Team on Climate Information for Decisionmaking (ET-CID).

Alexander has hosted international workshops, for the WMO across many developing countries. This also has led to development of software, called 'climpact' software, which is used to analyse and compute climate extremes. The Climpact software is utilised by National Hydrological and Meteorological Services in addition to other climate researchers internationally, to examine climate extremes. Alexander is a member of the Joint Scientific Committee of the World Climate Research Program.

She is also a member of the GEWEX Scientific Steering Group, and on the executive committee of the International Association of Meteorology and Atmospheric Sciences (IAMAS).

Publications 

As at 2022, Alexander had over 170 journal articles, on a range of topics including climate extremes, temperature and precipitation.  She was an author of the IPCC assessments in both 2001 and 2007. She contributed to the 2012 Special Report on Extremes, and Alexander was also a Lead Author of the IPCC's Fifth Assessment Report. Some of her select publications, including her most highly cited research, include the following:

 Global observed changes in daily climate extremes of temperature and precipitation. (2008) LV Alexander, X Zhang, TC Peterson, J Caesar, B Gleason, ... Journal of Geophysical Research: Atmospheres 111 (D5)
 On the measurement of heat waves (2013) SE Perkins, LV Alexander Journal of climate 26 (13), 4500–4517.
 Assessing trends in observed and modelled climate extremes over Australia in relation to future projections. (2009) LV Alexander, JM Arblaster International Journal of Climatology.

Prizes and awards

Media

Alexander has published seven articles in The Conversation, as well as ScienceDaily.

References 

Australian women academics
Living people
Year of birth missing (living people)
21st-century Australian women scientists
Monash University alumni
Alumni of Queen's University Belfast
Australian climatologists
Intergovernmental Panel on Climate Change contributing authors